Cowgate is a small hamlet in the civil parish of Holme St. Cuthbert in Cumbria, United Kingdom. It is situated approximately a quarter-of-a-mile south-west of Newtown, one mile north-west of the hamlet of Holme St. Cuthbert, and one-and-a-half miles north-east of Mawbray. Other nearby settlements include Goodyhills, one-and-a-quarter miles to the south-east, Hailforth, one-and-three-quarter miles to the south-east, and Beckfoot, one-and-a-half miles to the north. Carlisle, Cumbria's county town, is approximately twenty-four-and-a-half miles to the north-east.

History and etymology
The name Cowgate is derived from the Old English cu-gate, meaning a "cow pasture". Recorded variant spellings include Cowyate, Cowyeat, and Cowyeate.

References

Hamlets in Cumbria
Holme St Cuthbert